is one of the 100 Famous Japanese Mountains. The  peak lies on the border of Nagano Prefecture and Gunma Prefecture. There exist alternative spellings of the mountain's name, like: 吾妻山 and 吾嬬山 which is read as "Agatsuma-yama" (Mount Agatsuma). In the village Tsumagoi, the mountain is spelled 吾妻山.

Though the reading is the same, the name written in Kanji differs from the mountain in this article.

Outline  
Mount Azumaya was formed between 900,000 and 300,000 years ago by andesite lava flowing out of a Stratovolcano. An eruption 340,000 years ago formed a caldera of circa 3 kilometers in diameter. Through erosion the mountain has arrived at its present form with several peaks.  is the general term for the following peaks lying roughly on a circle: , Mount Azumaya, .

The famous Sugadaira Kōgen ski area is found on the mountain's southwest (Nagano-) side. Also on the Gunma-side there exists a ski area.

Main ascent routes 
The mountain is well connected with several hiking trails:
  -  - Mount Azumaya
  - Mount Azumaya
  - Mount Azumaya
  - Mount Azumaya
 The gondola from Palcall Tsumagoi is also operating during the summer season and can be used to climb the mountain

Mountain in the vicinity 
  (2,207m)

Gallery

See also
List of volcanoes in Japan
List of mountains in Japan

External links 

 Azumaya San - Geological Survey of Japan

Volcanoes of Honshū
Mountains of Nagano Prefecture
Mountains of Gunma Prefecture
Volcanoes of Gunma Prefecture
Volcanoes of Nagano Prefecture
Stratovolcanoes of Japan
Pleistocene stratovolcanoes